The 1894 Texas Longhorns football team represented the University of Texas at Austin in the 1894 college football season. Led by Reginald DeMerritt Wentworth in his first and only season as head coach, Texas compiled a record of 6–1 and outscored their opponents 191–28.

Schedule

References

Texas
Texas Longhorns football seasons
Texas Longhorns football